There are over 20,000 Grade II* listed buildings in England. This page is a list of these buildings in the district of Allerdale in Cumbria.

List of buildings

|}

Notes

External links

Allerdale
 
Allerdale